Lewandowski Point is a rugged, partially ice-free point on the coast of Victoria Land, Antarctica, marking the south side of the mouth of Clarke Glacier. It was mapped by the United States Geological Survey from surveys and U.S. Navy tricamera aerial photographs, 1957–62, and was named by the Advisory Committee on Antarctic Names for John R. Lewandowski, U.S. Navy, Chief Construction Electrician at McMurdo Station, 1965–66 and 1966–67.

References

Headlands of Victoria Land
Scott Coast